Macedonia (officially under the provisional appellation "former Yugoslav Republic of Macedonia", abbreviated "FYR Macedonia") participated in the Eurovision Song Contest 2018 with the song "Lost and Found" written by Bojan Trajkovski and Darko Dimitrov. The song was performed by the group Eye Cue, which were internally selected by the Macedonian broadcaster Macedonian Radio Television (MRT) to compete for Macedonia at the 2018 contest in Lisbon, Portugal. Eye Cue's appointment as the Macedonian representative was announced on 13 February 2018, while their song, "Lost and Found", was presented to the public on 11 March 2018.

Macedonia was drawn to compete in the first semi-final of the Eurovision Song Contest which took place on 8 May 2018. Performing during the show in position 11, "Lost and Found" was not announced among the top 10 entries of the first semi-final and therefore did not qualify to compete in the final. It was later revealed that Macedonia placed eighteenth out of the 19 participating countries in the semi-final with 24 points.

Background

The nation's best result in the contest to this point was twelfth, which it achieved in 2006 with the song "Ninanajna" performed by Elena Risteska.

The Macedonian national broadcaster, Macedonian Radio Television (MRT), broadcasts the event within Macedonia and organises the selection process for the nation's entry. Macedonia had previously selected their entry for the Eurovision Song Contest through both national finals and internal selections. On 30 October 2017, the European Broadcasting Union (EBU) stated that the nation would not be allowed to participate at the 2018 Eurovision Song Contest as MRT no longer had access to their services due to the non-payment of debt amounting nearly 22 million euros. On 17 November 2017, MRT confirmed their intentions to participate at the 2018 contest after sanctions were lifted by the EBU. Between 2008 and 2011, Macedonia selected their entries using the national final Skopje Fest. During this period, the nation failed to qualify to the final on every occasion. After failing to qualify in 2015 where Skopje Fest was used as a national final, the broadcaster internally selected the nation's entry in 2016 and 2017. Both entries failed to bring the country to the final, including in 2017 with Jana Burčeska and the song "Dance Alone". For 2018, the broadcaster again opted to internally select the Macedonian entry.

Before Eurovision

Internal selection 
A submission period was opened for interested composers to submit their songs between 26 January 2018 and 8 February 2018. MRT received 382 submissions at the closing of the deadline. On 13 February 2018, the broadcaster announced that the band Eye Cue had been selected to represent Macedonia in Lisbon, performing the song "Lost and Found". The band consists of vocalists Bojan Trajkovski and Marija Ivanovska, and drummer Ivo Mitkovski. "Lost and Found" was written and composed by Trajkovski together with Darko Dimitrov, and was selected from 12 shortlisted songs by an eight-member committee consisting of Meri Popova (MRT 1), Karolina Petkovska (MRT 1), Aleksandra Jovanovska (MRT 1), Avni Qahili (MRT 2), Branka Kostić-Marković (music journalist and critic), Andrijana Jovanovska (reporter.mk), Marko Mark (Channel 77 and Telma) and Antonio Dimitrievski (vistina.mk).

On 11 March 2018, "Lost and Found" was presented to the public along with the official music video, directed by Jovan Kucinovski, during the MRT evening news programme Dnevnik 2. In regards to the song, Bojan Trajkovski stated: "It is a song about deep and unconditional love where one can dive deeper into the world of the unknown and experience the magic of true and powerful love. I hope Eurovision viewers will enjoy the cheerful melody and the charming vocals of Marija."

Promotion 
Eye Cue made several appearances across Europe to specifically promote "Lost and Found" as the Macedonian Eurovision entry. Between 8 and 11 April, Eye Cue took part in promotional activities in Tel Aviv, Israel and performed during the Israel Calling event held at the Rabin Square. On 14 April, Eye Cue performed during the Eurovision in Concert event which was held at the AFAS Live venue in Amsterdam, Netherlands and hosted by Edsilia Rombley and Cornald Maas. On 21 April, Eye Cue performed during the ESPreParty event on 21 April which was held at the Sala La Riviera venue in Madrid, Spain and hosted by Soraya Arnelas.

At Eurovision 
According to Eurovision rules, all nations with the exceptions of the host country and the "Big Five" (France, Germany, Italy, Spain and the United Kingdom) are required to qualify from one of two semi-finals in order to compete for the final; the top ten countries from each semi-final progress to the final. The European Broadcasting Union (EBU) split up the competing countries into six different pots based on voting patterns from previous contests, with countries with favourable voting histories put into the same pot. On 29 January 2018, a special allocation draw was held which placed each country into one of the two semi-finals, as well as which half of the show they would perform in. Macedonia was placed into the first semi-final, to be held on 8 May 2018, and was scheduled to perform in the second half of the show.

Once all the competing songs for the 2018 contest had been released, the running order for the semi-finals was decided by the shows' producers rather than through another draw, so that similar songs were not placed next to each other. Macedonia was set to perform in position 11, following the entry from Bulgaria and before the entry from Croatia.

The two semi-finals and final were broadcast in Macedonia on MRT 1, MRT 2 and Macedonian Radio with commentary by Karolina Petkovska. The Macedonian spokesperson, who announced the top 12-point score awarded by the Macedonian jury during the final, was 2017 Macedonian Eurovision representative Jana Burčeska.

Semi-final

Eye Cue took part in technical rehearsals on 30 April and 3 May, followed by dress rehearsals on 7 and 8 May. This included the jury show on 7 May where the professional juries of each country watched and voted on the competing entries.

The Macedonian performance featured the members of Eye Cue performing on stage; Marija Ivanovska wore a short metallic pink dress which she later removed to reveal a grey and pink netted top with grey denim shorts, while Bojan Trajkovski wore a white patterned shirt and black pants. The band was joined on stage by three dancers, which also performed backing vocals, in black body suits with pink and orange frills. During the first chorus, Ivanovska joined the backing performers to perform a synchronised routine. The stage colours were predominately pink, blue and yellow with the performers ending the song at the stage bridge. The three backing performers were Antonia Gigovska, Dina Jashari and Valery Dimovska.

At the end of the show, Macedonia was not announced among the top 10 entries in the second semi-final and therefore failed to qualify to compete in the final. It was later revealed that Macedonia placed eighteenth in the semi-final, receiving a total of 24 points: 6 points from the televoting and 18 points from the juries.

Voting
Voting during the three shows involved each country awarding two sets of points from 1-8, 10 and 12: one from their professional jury and the other from televoting. Each nation's jury consisted of five music industry professionals who are citizens of the country they represent, with their names published before the contest to ensure transparency. This jury judged each entry based on: vocal capacity; the stage performance; the song's composition and originality; and the overall impression by the act. In addition, no member of a national jury was permitted to be related in any way to any of the competing acts in such a way that they cannot vote impartially and independently. The individual rankings of each jury member as well as the nation's televoting results were released shortly after the grand final.

Below is a breakdown of points awarded to Macedonia and awarded by Macedonia in the second semi-final and grand final of the contest, and the breakdown of the jury voting and televoting conducted during the two shows:

Points awarded to Macedonia

Points awarded by Macedonia

Detailed voting results
The following members comprised the Macedonian jury:
 Miodrag Vrčakovski (jury chairperson)songwriter, radio journalist
 Ile Spasevmusic teacher, composer, music producer
 Ana Pandevskacomposer
 composer, music producer
 Stefanija Leškova Zelenovskamusicologist, music journalist

References 

2018
Countries in the Eurovision Song Contest 2018
Eurovision